Kavithalayaa Productions is an Indian film production and distribution company based in Chennai. It was founded by filmmaker K. Balachander in 1981. It has a library of 50+ films in three languages and 3500+ hours of television content. Kavithalayaa is currently releasing the olden serials in YouTube including Thuru Pidikkum Manasu.

History
In 1981 Kavithalayaa Productions was founded by the legendary filmmaker Dadasaheb Phalke awardee K.Balachander. Having produced over 50+ films many of them being huge hits they also have provided with 3500+ hours of television content entertaining people to the most.

Having successfully mastered the art of storytelling for the big and small screen over three decades, Kavithalayaa has entered the digital media. Keeping in mind the current trends in an endeavour to keep pace witnessed in entertainment consumption patterns, both globally and in India, they've released their maiden digital series Harmony with A. R. Rahman on Prime video India.

The failure of Kuselan (2008) directly impacted the progress of the studio's other films, which were in production. Two films which they were producing by director Selva, Nootrukku Nooru with Vinay, Sneha and Sandhya, and Muriyadi with Sathyaraj, Ganesh Venkatraman and Remya Nambeesan were shelved, despite commencing production. Likewise, Shelvan's Krishnaleelai featuring Jeevan and Meghana Raj, was also cancelled. The director of the film threatened to hold an indefinite fast against the production house's reluctance to release the film in 2011, but to no avail.

Filmography

Series

Television

Web series

Awards

Notes

External links 

Film distributors of India
Film production companies of India
Film production companies based in Chennai
Producers who won the Best Film on National Integration National Film Award
1981 establishments in Tamil Nadu
Producers who won the Best Film on Other Social Issues National Film Award
Companies established in 1981
Television production companies of Tamil Nadu